Akhkent is a rural locality (a selo) in Levashinsky District, Republic of Dagestan, Russia. The population was 301 as of 2010. There are 6 streets.

Geography 
Akhkent is located 26 km northwest of Levashi (the district's administrative centre) by road. Okhli and Kuletsma are the nearest rural localities.

Nationalities 
Dargins live there.

References 

Rural localities in Levashinsky District